Julius Harburger (1850 – November 9, 1914) was a New York City politician. He was elected as the Sheriff of New York County, New York, from 1911 to December 31, 1913. He also served as the Coroner of New York County, New York, in 1907 serving as the president of the board of coroners.

Biography
He was born in 1850 in Manhattan, New York City.

He was a member of the New York State Assembly (New York Co., 10th D.) in 1898, 1899, 1900 and 1901. He served as the Coroner of New York County in 1907 serving as the president of the board of coroners. He served with George Frederick Shrady, Jr.

He was elected as the Sheriff of New York County  from 1911 to December 31, 1913.

He died on November 9, 1914 at his home on St. Mark's Place in Manhattan of congested lungs.

References

1850 births
1914 deaths
Democratic Party members of the New York State Assembly
Sheriffs of New York County, New York
Coroners of New York County, New York